Ely House may refer to:

Ireland
Ely Place, Dublin: No. 8 is Ely House, headquarters of the Knights of Saint Columbanus.

United Kingdom
Ely Place, a gated road at the southern tip of the London Borough of Camden in London, England.
Ely Palace, the former London residence of the Bishops of Ely

United States
Ashe Cottage, Demopolis, Alabama, listed on the National Register of Historic Places (NRHP) in Marengo County, also known as Ely House
Rev. John Ely House, Bethel, Connecticut, listed on the NRHP in Fairfield County
Ely-Criglar House, Marianna, Florida, listed on the NRHP in Jackson County
Mrs. C. Morse Ely House, Lake Bluff, Illinois, listed on the NRHP in Lake County, Illinois
Ely Homestead, Lafayette, Indiana, listed on the NRHP in Tippecanoe County, Indiana
Ely School House, Ely, Iowa, listed on the NRHP in Linn County, Iowa
Smith-Ely Mansion, Clyde, New York, listed on the NRHP in Wayne County
Hervey Ely House, Rochester, New York, listed on the NRHP in Monroe County
Joshua Ely House, New Hope, Pennsylvania, listed on the NRHP in Bucks County, Pennsylvania
Hamilton-Ely Farmstead, Whitely Township, Pennsylvania, listed on the NRHP in Greene County, Pennsylvania
Richard T. Ely House, Madison, Wisconsin, listed on the NRHP in Dane County, Wisconsin

See also
Ely Block, Elyria, Ohio, listed on the NRHP in Lorain County, Ohio
Ely Mound, Rose Hill, Virginia, listed on the NRHP in Lee County, Virginia
Ely's Stone Bridge, Monticello, Iowa, listed on the NRHP in Jones County, Iowa